The 2013–14 Armenian Premier League season was the twenty-second since its establishment. Shirak F.C. were the winners. The league started on 3 August 2013.

Teams

 1FC Alashkert moved to the Hrazdan Stadium starting from matchday 16.
 2Ulisses FC moved to the City Stadium in Abovyan starting from matchday 17.

League table

Results
The league will be played in four stages. The teams will play four times with each other, twice at home and twice away, for a total of 28 matches per team.

First half of season

Second half of season

Top goalscorers

See also
 2013–14 Armenian First League
 2013–14 Armenian Cup

References

External links
 ffa.am
 soccerway.com
 uefa.com
 rsssf.com

Armenian Premier League seasons
Armenian Premier League
1